Rudy Garcia may refer to:

 Rudy García (Florida politician) (born 1963), Republican member of the Florida Senate
 Rudy Garcia (New Jersey politician) (born 1964), American Democratic Party politician who served in the New Jersey General Assembly
 Rudy Joseph Garcia, killed by law enforcement